Eremophila shonae is a flowering plant in the figwort family, Scrophulariaceae and is endemic to Western Australia. It is an erect shrub or a low spreading shrub, depending on subspecies and has very sticky branches and leaves due to the presence of large amounts of resin. The leaves are narrow and the flowers are mauve to purple and white inside with purple spots.

Description
Eremophila shonae is an erect shrub with hairy leaves or sometimes a low, open shrub with glabrous leaves, depending on subspecies.

The petal tube is mauve, purple or violet on the outside and white with purple spots inside the tube. The outside of the petal tube and lobes is hairy but the inside surface is glabrous apart from the base of the lobes and the inside of the tube which is filled with woolly hairs. The 4 stamens are enclosed in the petal tube. Flowering time depends on subspecies.

Taxonomy and naming 
The species was first formally described by Robert Chinnock in 2007 and the description was published in Eremophila and Allied Genera: A Monograph of the Plant Family Myoporaceae. The specific epithet (shonae) honours the author's wife, Shona Chinnock.

There are two subspecies:

Distribution and habitat
Subspecies shonae grows in shallow, stony soils in rocky places and is widespread in areas from the north of Mullewa to the Wiluna area in the Murchison and Yalgoo biogeographic regions. Subspecies diffusa grows in sandy soil near granite in rocky places between New Springs and Yarlarweelor pastoral stations in the Gascoyne and Murchison biogeographic regions.

Conservation
Subspecies shonae is classified as "not threatened" but subspecies diffusa is classified as "Priority Three" by the Western Australian Government Department of Parks and Wildlife meaning that it is poorly known and known from only a few locations but is not under imminent threat.

Use in horticulture
The generally light-coloured flowers of this shrub contrast attractively with its dark green foliage. It can be propagated from cuttings or by grafting onto Myoporum rootstock and grows best in well-drained soil in a sunny location. It is drought tolerant but can be damaged, sometimes killed by severe frosts.

References

shonae
Eudicots of Western Australia
Endemic flora of Western Australia
Plants described in 2007
Taxa named by Robert Chinnock